The Academy of Fine Arts and Design (also known by the acronym ALUO), is an art academy and institution based in Ljubljana, Slovenia. It is part of the University of Ljubljana.

From 1945 to 1961, Božidar Jakac taught graphic arts at the academy, and also served as a dean three times. The current dean of the academy is Lucija Močnik Ramovš.

Notable faculty
 Jože Ciuha (1924–2015)
 Božidar Jakac (1899–1989)
 Boris Kalin (1905–1975)
 Gojmir Anton Kos (1896–1970)
 Adriana Maraž (1931-2015)
 Miki Muster (1925-2018)
 Igor Torkar (1913–2004)

References

External links
 Academy of Fine Arts and Design - homepage
 

Fine arts
Art schools in Ljubljana
Design schools
Educational institutions established in 1945
1945 establishments in Yugoslavia